The 2022 Berlin ePrix was a pair of Formula E electric car races held at the Tempelhof Airport Street Circuit at Tempelhof Airport in the outskirts of Berlin, Germany on 4 and 15 May 2022. It served as the seventh and eighth rounds of the 2021–22 Formula E season, and marked the eighth edition of the Berlin ePrix, the only event to have featured in every season of the Formula E championship. The first race was won by Edoardo Mortara for ROKiT Venturi Racing, with Jean-Éric Vergne and Stoffel Vandoorne in second and third place respectively. The second race was won by Nyck de Vries for the Mercedes-EQ team, with Edoardo Mortara and Stoffel Vandoorne completing the podium.

Classification

Race one

Qualifying

Qualifying duels

Overall classification

Race

Notes:
  – Pole position.
  – Fastest lap.

Race two

Qualifying duels

Overall classification

Race

Notes:
  – Pole position.
  – Fastest lap.

Notes

References

|- style="text-align:center"
|width="35%"|Previous race:2022 Monaco ePrix
|width="30%"|FIA Formula E World Championship2021–22 season
|width="35%"|Next race:2022 Jakarta ePrix
|- style="text-align:center"
|width="35%"|Previous race:2021 Berlin ePrix
|width="30%"|Berlin ePrix
|width="35%"|Next race:2023 Berlin ePrix
|- style="text-align:center"

2022
2021–22 Formula E season
2022 in German motorsport
May 2022 sports events in Germany